Al Karam Secondary School, also known as Jamia Al-Karam, was a Muslim boarding school and Islamic Studies College located in Eaton, England.

The school was managed by Muhammad Imdad Hussain Pirzada.

References

External links

Muhammad Imdad Hussain Pirzada official website

Educational institutions established in 1985
Educational institutions disestablished in 2014
Defunct schools in Nottinghamshire
Boys' schools in Nottinghamshire
Boarding schools in Nottinghamshire
Defunct Islamic schools in England
Barelvi
1985 establishments in England
2014 disestablishments in England